This is a list of notable flights across the English Channel.

First attempts

References

English Channel
United Kingdom aviation-related lists
Aviation history of France
Aviation history of the United Kingdom
English Channel